Western Sydney University, formerly the University of Western Sydney, is an Australian multi-campus university in the Greater Western region of Sydney, Australia. The university in its current form was founded in 1989 as a federated network university with an amalgamation between the Nepean College of Advanced Education and the Hawkesbury Agricultural College. The Macarthur Institute of Higher Education was incorporated in the university in 1989. In 2001, the University of Western Sydney was restructured as a single multi-campus university rather than as a federation. In 2015, the university underwent a rebranding which resulted in a change in name from the University of Western Sydney to Western Sydney University. It is a provider of undergraduate, postgraduate, and higher research degrees with campuses in Bankstown, Blacktown, Campbelltown, Hawkesbury, Liverpool, Parramatta, and Penrith.

In 2022, it was ranked in the top 201–250 in the world and jointly 11th in Australia, while being ranked 1st globally in the impact ranking as per the Times Higher Education World University Rankings.

History

Foundation and early years 

The university consists of an amalgamation of campuses, each with their own unique and individual history. In 1891, the Hawkesbury campus was established as an agricultural college by the NSW Agricultural Society. At Parramatta, Western Sydney University owns and has renovated the Female Orphan School building, the foundation stone of which was laid by Governor Lachlan Macquarie in 1813.

In 1987, the New South Wales Labor government planned to name the university Chifley University, after the former Labor Prime Minister, Ben Chifley. However, in 1989, a new Liberal government reversed this decision and controversially named it the University of Western Sydney.

In 1989, teachers' colleges and Colleges of Advanced Education in Sydney's western suburbs were given university status under the University of Western Sydney Act of 1988. The 1990s saw the federation of three education providers: UWS Nepean, UWS Hawkesbury, and UWS Macarthur.  1989 was the year the Hawke federal labour government introduced HECS, the Higher Education Contribution Scheme. The university has a legislative basis in NSW state legislation with the passing of the University of Western Sydney Act 1997, which also empowers the university to make by-laws affecting the operation of the university. In 2000, in order to reduce administrative expenses and duplication of courses offered by the inner Sydney universities and to eliminate competition between Western Sydney University member institutions, Western Sydney University became one multi-campus university.

Recent history (2000 to present) 

Federal Government funding of Australia's universities as a percentage of Australia's GDP was in decline during the years of the Howard government. Federal funding policy was very influential at UWS. In 2000, after internal restructuring and cost-cutting, UWS Hawkesbury, UWS Macarthur, and UWS Nepean ceased to exist as autonomous components of the now defunct University of Western Sydney federation and became the new multi-campus University of Western Sydney. In the 2000s, UWS consolidated its schools of fine art, social science, humanities, and psychology.  In this decade the university introduced its first nanotechnology and biotechnology undergraduate degrees.

In 2003, UWS sponsored a Samuel Beckett symposium as part of the Sydney Festival. In 2004, UWS joined with Metro Screen and SLICE TV to successfully bid for Sydney's first permanent Community Television licence. Television Sydney, broadcasting as TVS, launched in February 2006 from a broadcast operations centre located on the Werrington South Campus. In 2006, the UWS news site reported: "Demand to study at the University of Western Sydney is on the rise, with UWS receiving the third-biggest jump in first preferences among NSW and ACT universities for 2007". In 2007, UWS had its first intake for the Bachelor of Medicine / Bachelor of Surgery. In the same year, UWS was part of a consortium with Griffith University and the University of Melbourne to win funding for a National Centre of Excellence for Islamic Studies.

In 2008, UWS announced its current water and energy saving strategies, its Indigenous Advisory Board, and endorsed Prime Minister Kevin Rudd's apology to the Stolen Generations. In 2011 and 2012, Professor's Roy Tasker and James Arvanitakis, respectively, were announced as the Prime Minister's Australian University Teacher of the Year.

On 30 August 2015, the University of Western Sydney underwent a rebranding which resulted in a change in name to Western Sydney University. Many students criticised the re-branding, calling it a waste of money that stripped the university community of its established identity.

Controversies

Reports of on-campus sexual assault and harassment 
Between 2011 and 2016, there were 28 officially reported cases of sexual abuse and harassment on campus, resulting in no expulsions, no suspensions, and 7 warnings. The 2017 Australian Human Rights Commission report on sexual assault and harassment gave figures substantially higher than this.

Complementary medicine 
Early in 2016, some controversy surrounding the university's full support of complementary medicine and the university's alleged spying on employees who lodge complaints in good faith emerged in the press. An employee, as well as eminent scientists, criticised the support of the university for complementary medicines such as homeopathy, acupuncture, TCM, and energy healing etc. The main controversial aspect was the continued support of these pseudo-scientific fields in exchange for continued funding from the naturopathic Jacka Foundation of Natural Therapies.

The National Institute of Complementary Medicine (NICM), a part of Western Sydney University, won the Bent Spoon Award in November 2017. This award is bestowed by the Australian Skeptics to 'the perpetrator of the most preposterous piece of paranormal or pseudo-scientific piffle'.
In early 2017, the university unsuccessfully attempted to block their Bent Spoon nomination. This led to a number of articles appearing in the media taking an in-depth look at the National Institute of Complementary Medicine. The university was found to have accepted an untied gift of $10 million from the controversial supplement company, Blackmores. These funds will partly be used to establish a traditional Chinese medicine 'hospital' in Sydney's health precinct, Westmead.

Campuses 
The Western Sydney University is made up of six campuses and one precinct. Each campus hosts an array of courses and different units can be completed across multiple campuses.

Bankstown 
Specialising in the social sciences, most of the students on campus are psychology, sociology, arts, linguistics, and education students. The campus also hosts the Bachelor of Policing degree and much of The MARCS Institute. The campus also includes a modern cafeteria/eatery area as well as Oliver brown.

Students on campus specialise in the social sciences. Most are psychology, sociology, nursing, arts and linguistic students. The campus is also home to the Bachelor of Policing program. The campus includes a modern cafeteria area, a new library, a full-size football oval, and the MARCS Institute.
UWS's most well-known interpreting and translation course is taught at Bankstown campus. UWS trains and produces many NAATI accredited interpreters and translators.

It was the original campus of the Macarthur Institute of Higher Education, which merged into the then-new university in 1989; however, as a result of widespread rebuilding by WSU, the oldest building on campus was opened in 1989. The building contains a plaque indicating that it was opened by the then treasurer and later Prime Minister Paul Keating.

Western Sydney University is planning a new vertical campus in the Bankstown CBD. The campus will cater to 10,000 students and 700 staff with courses in education, psychology, business and IT. The new Bankstown City campus is set to open in early 2022. In December 2019, Western Sydney University announced a partnership with the University of Technology Sydney which will see the two universities collaborate on postgraduate teaching and research. The two universities will also co-locate their business incubator programs at the new Bankstown City Campus.

Blacktown 
In 2009, Western Sydney University opened The College at the old Blacktown campus of the university after protest about the divesting of property and resources from the site.

The university's Nirimba campus is built on the site of HMAS Nirimba, a former naval aviation base, and is also known as the Nirimba Education Precinct, located in Nirimba Fields, about a 10-minute drive from Blacktown. The nearest railway station is Quakers Hill station in the neighbouring suburb of Quakers Hill. The campus has many historical buildings and two crossed air runways that ceased operation 1994. The Nirimba campus has student accommodation, air-conditioned lecture theatres and rooms built in the 1990s. The campus has views of the now closed Schofields Aerodrome. Campus numbers have dwindled since the university reduced the range of courses available. The campus is primarily a single-discipline campus, offering business courses which are also taught at other Western Sydney University campuses. Nirimba campus is not far from Norwest Business Park.

Located in the Nirimba Education Precinct in Nirimba Fields, the campus is the home of the Western Sydney University-owned UWSCollege. Western Sydney University shares the precinct with TAFE NSW-Western Sydney Institute, Nirimba College, St John Paul II Catholic College and Wyndham College. Together the institutions "work through a collaborative partnership focusing on innovation, enterprise and dedication in achieving the best possible outcomes for students."

In recent times there has been much controversy over the status of this campus, at one point Western Sydney University was depicted in the media as abandoning the campus and the local area it served. There was even a council run protest at the closure called Save UWS Nirimba, where politicians and the university were petitioned to save the campus from closure, later it was decided rather than divesting they would set up The College. Western Sydney University has recently announced for its Blacktown campus a brand new Medical facility called the Blacktown-Mount Druitt Clinical school which would be based at Blacktown Hospital, making it the second clinical school associated with the School of Medicine; the first school being the Macarthur Clinical School at Campbelltown Hospital which opened in March 2007. In 2017 the university announced plans to sell off land held on the Nirimba site, previously set aside for student accommodation.

The library located in C21 was originally a dual purpose library, though run and staffed by Western Sydney University it was also used as the TAFE library. Now a 'triple purpose' library is also caters to the students of The College. Both WSI TAFE and The College provide funding to Western Sydney University for this privilege, however as with all Western Sydney University libraries, purchasing, collection maintenance and staffing is managed centrally.

Campbelltown 
The Campbelltown Campus is located in the semi-rural Macarthur region in South Western Sydney. Together with the Bankstown campus, the Campbelltown campus was originally part of the Macarthur Institute of Higher Education, founded in 1984. The campus offers degrees (among many others) in medicine, health, sciences, nursing, law and business. Research centres are also located in the campus.

In 2007, the School of Medicine was established and began offering the Bachelor of Medicine/Bachelor of Surgery (MBBS) degree for the first time in the university's history. It is hoped that many of the School's graduates will practice in the Western Sydney region, in order to redress the shortage of healthcare professionals in the area.

The on-campus student accommodation (called 'Gunydji') was upgraded in 2010 with a maximum occupancy of 205.  It is a complex of self-contained units that accommodate one to five tenants each.

The campus is home to the UWS Rotary Observatory, designed by Dr. Ragbir Bhathal, consisting of two observing domes of 4.5m and 2.9m diameter respectively, opened on 15 July 2000. The observatory is principally utilised for Optical S.E.T.I. research but also hosts community astronomy nights, in collaboration with Macarthur Astronomical Society. In 2013 the observatory was relocated to make way for a new residential housing estate to the south of the campus. It was reopened in a new location on 2 October 2014. The campus also provides the venue for the Macarthur Astronomy Forum.

Hawkesbury 

The Hawkesbury campus, also known as the Richmond campus, is located on a  site in the Hawkesbury Valley in north-western Sydney, next to the town of Richmond. Courses are offered in environmental health, forensic science, nursing, medical science, natural science (environmental, agricultural, horticultural), secondary school science teaching. Hawkesbury campus facilities include research labs, farmland, aquacultural (not operational) and equine facilities, residential halls and cottages, a conference centre, religious centres, a campus social hub called Stable Square, featuring cafeterias, a bar (not operational), a music room and a large collection of Hawkesbury Agricultural College memorabilia.

The campus was originally the Hawkesbury Agricultural College, established by the New South Wales Department of Agriculture in 1891. It later became a College of Advanced Education until 1989, then UWS Hawkesbury (as a member institution of UWS with campuses and Richmond and Quaker's Hill) until 2000. The School of Agriculture operated a commercial dairy until it closed in 2004.

The Hawkesbury campus houses the Hawkesbury Forest Experiment. The experiment consists of twelve giant chambers with individual, living trees in controlled environments which will help predict what will happen to the Australian bush over the next century.

This campus is also home to the forensic science degree and holds a crime scene house, various forensic lab equipment. The Centre for Plant and Food Science is also located at this campus.

Hawkesbury Earthcare Centre, an organic farming organisation with a seedbank is located at Hawkesbury Campus. The centre is affiliated with Henry Doubleday Research and the Alternative Technology Association.

The Hawkesbury campus is next to Richmond TAFE. The nearest railway station is East Richmond

Parramatta 

The Parramatta Campus was first established on the site of the Female Orphan School, which was founded in 1813. The site was formerly home to Rydalmere Psychiatric hospital and is located at the eastern end of Parramatta, near the border with the suburb of Rydalmere. It now houses the Whitlam Institute.

The Rydalmere campus was established as a campus of UWS in 1998. It is the nearest campus to the Sydney CBD.

Parramatta campus courses include occupation fields like Science, Business, and Law. It also hosts their Science courses in modern buildings near to the Rydalmere campus at a site formerly used by quarantine authorities, CSIRO, Amdel Sugar, and the Biological and Chemical Research Institute laboratories.

The university announced the establishment of a new campus in the Parramatta CBD as an extension of its existing Parramatta Campus in 2014.

Penrith 
The Penrith Campuses are made up of three areas in two Sydney suburbs; Kingswood, Werrington South and Werrington North.

Kingswood has most of the campus's student services and facilities, computer rooms, classrooms and lecture theatres. It also has tennis courts, a gym, a bar (the Swamp Bar) and student accommodation. The Allen Library and Ward Library have now merged and are housed in a new building on the Kingswood campus. The new building (John Phillips Library) has been shortlisted for the 2015 World Architecture Festival (WAF) Awards.

Werrington South has fewer classrooms and lecture theatres. Werrington South also contains the faculty of communications, design and media. This is the campus for the Bachelor of Design (Visual Communications) degree. As of the end of 2016, these classes were no longer offered on this campus, can saw both the Design and Media arts subjects be relocated to Parramatta and the remaining classes be transferred to Kingswood. Majority of this site is now used for staff purposes.

Werrington North used to be a teaching campus but is now administration only, and houses the Chancellor and Vice Chancellor's offices. It also has the Nepean Observatory built by Dr Graeme White (no longer with UWS) and members of the UWS Centre for Astronomy.

Focus areas are split between Werrington South and Kingswood, with most engineering, computing, music and humanities subjects having classes in Kingswood and design having classes at Werrington South.

Western Sydney University also hosts the broadcast centre of Sydney's community television station TVS on Werrington South located in Building BD. As of 2015 TVS no longer broadcasts from this location due to the change of community licensing for stations ending in 2015. This change was made by then communications minister Malcolm Turnbull.

Western Sydney University hosts the radio broadcast centre of ABC Local Radio, ABC Radio National, ABC Classic FM, Triple J, ABC NewsRadio, ABC Dig Music, ABC Jazz, & ABC Country from the Ultimo radio studios.

Board of Trustees 
The board of trustees is the peak jurisdiction for the university and has members consisting from Ministerial appointments, academic appointments, and an undergraduate and post-graduate student representative.

Academia

Schools 
Western Sydney University's academic activity is organised into "schools" of various academic faculties.

The university formerly had nine schools:

 School of Business
 School of Computing, Engineering and Mathematics
 School of Education
 School of Humanities and Communication Arts
 School of Law
 School of Medicine
 School of Nursing and Midwifery
 School of Social Sciences and Psychology
 School of Science and Health

In 2019, the Board of Trustees approved the establishment of the following Schools from January 2020:

 School of Health
 School of Science
 School of Social Sciences
 School of Psychology
 School of the Built Environment, Architecture and Industrial Design
 School of Computer, Data and Mathematical Sciences
 School of Engineering

And the concurrent disestablishment of the following existing Schools:
 School of Science and Health
 School of Social Sciences and Psychology
 School of Computing, Engineering and Mathematics

Research institutes and centres 
In 2013 Western Sydney University was successful in obtaining over $5.8 million in grants from the prestigious Australian Research Council for 18 Discovery Projects, placing it 11th out of 40 universities in Australia.

The Hawkesbury Institute for the Environment was officially opened in 2012, funded by a $40 million grant from the Australian Government Education Investment Fund. It houses some of the largest and most complex facilities in the world for researching the effects of climate change.

The Religion and Society Research Cluster grew out of the Centre for the Study of Contemporary Muslim Studies. It maintains a particular focus on religion, mutliculturalism and post-secularism. Cristina Rocha has been director of the centre since 2014.

Western Sydney University has 11 Research Institutes and Centres.

Prominent academics 
The winner of the 2007 Miles Franklin Literary Award, Alexis Wright, was a UWS Postdoctoral Research Fellow in 2010.

In 2011, author Anita Heiss was Adjunct Associate Professor at the university, attached to the Badanami Centre for Indigenous Education (see below).

Award-winning Australian author Gail Jones was a professor in the university's Writing and Society Research Centre .

Rankings and reputation 
Western Sydney University was jointly ranked 11th in Australia in 2023 according to the Times Higher Education World University Rankings.

Student life

Student representation and participation 
Prior to 2009, Western Sydney University had two student organisations, each with its own focus and areas of responsibility. These organisations voluntarily shut down operations in 2009. These organisations were responsible for the bulk of extracurricular activities and services provided by the university.

Each organisation previously sourced their funds from Compulsory Student Unionism fees. With the passage of Voluntary Student Unionism legislation, UWS agreed to fund the organisations, but at a substantially reduced level. UWSSA also asked students to pay a voluntary $60 fee.

UWSSA and PAUWS were independent of the university while UWSConnect is wholly owned by UWS.

 UWSSA Inc. — UWS Students' Association. Its motto was "Bringing life to knowledge " – a twist on the university's motto. It aimed to improve student life at the university by providing welfare and support services, and ran campaigns on issues affecting the student population.
 PAUWS Inc. — The Postgraduate Association of UWS was a student's association for the postgraduate student population at the university.

UWSConnect Ltd. — UWSConnect is a not-for-profit company owned by the university which aims to improve university life by providing bars, cafés, sporting events, recreational activities, etc. It is responsible for organising commercial ties with the university and its students, such as advertising space within the university, vending machines and student discounts and special offers.

In 2019 the university restructured student representation, with the Western Sydney University Student Representative Council (SRC) becoming the peak representative body for all enrolled students at Western Sydney University. The Council consists of 22 Representatives elected to represent the various campuses of Western Sydney University, Consisting of campus representative, collective officers, and the executive.

Residences 
Western Sydney University has on-campus accommodation in the form of the UWS Village located adjacent to its Parramatta Campus. The village was opened in February 2009, providing apartments from one to eight bedrooms. At the time of opening, the village was the third Campus Living Villages property to be established in Sydney after the Macquarie University Village and the Sydney University Village.

Badanami Centre for Indigenous Education 
The Badanami Centre for Indigenous Education provides support to Aboriginal and Torres Strait Islander students. It has a centre on each campus, staffed by people who share their knowledge and experience of life for Indigenous students.

Sport 
Connect Fitness — Connect Fitness is a not for profit organisation located on the grounds of Western Sydney University with four gyms now in operation over the Kingswood, Hawkesbury, Bankstown & Campbelltown campuses.

Media 
WSUPnews is the student newspaper of the Western Sydney University. W'SUP was previously known as cruWsible which was established in 2013.

Publications 

The university publishes the Australian Edition of the Global Media Journal (GMJ/AU), an online journal that publishes "essays and research reports that focus on any aspects in the field of Communication, Media and Journalism". Its first edition was published in 2007.

Notable people 

The current and seventh Chancellor of the university since January 2011 is Peter Shergold, a former senior public servant and academic. The current Vice-Chancellor and President of the university since January 2014 is Barney Glover.

Ig Nobel Prize 
In 2014, Peter K. Jonason a Postgraduate Psychology professor at UWS with a PhD in Psychology won the Ig Nobel Prize for Psychology in 2014 for his research into the "dark side" of human nature completed in 2013 under the report titled "Creatures of the Night: Chronotypes and the Dark Triad Traits," Peter K. Jonason, Amy Jones, and Minna Lyons, Personality and Individual Differences, vol. 55, no. 5, 2013, pp. 538–541.

Gallery

See also 

List of universities in Australia
Television Sydney (TVS)

References

External links 

University site
Sydney Graduate School of Management
UWS TeleHealth Research and Innovation Laboratory (THRIL)

 
Educational institutions established in 1989
Universities in Sydney
1989 establishments in Australia